Honra e Ciúmes is a 1933 Brazilian film directed by Antonio Tibiriçá. It is believed to be a lost film.

Cast 
Antonio Sorrentino	...	The Defendant
Amanda Leilop	...	The Victim
Antonio Tibiriçá	...	The Lawyer
Leandro Freitas	...	The Baritone
Anita Sabatini Sorrentino	...	The Soprano
Tamar Moema	...	Girl in Love
Carlos Eugênio	...	Young Man in Love
Paulo Marra	...	The Butler
Otto Sachs	...	Escrivão
Alfredo Nunes	...	The Judge
Adhemar Gonzaga	...	Juror with Spectacles
Pery Ribas	...	Juror
Victor Ciacchi	...	Juror
Carmo Nacarato	...	Bitt
Maestro Vivas	...	The Conductor

References

External links

Lost Brazilian films
1933 films
1933 musical comedy films
Brazilian musical comedy films
1930s Portuguese-language films
Cinédia films
Brazilian black-and-white films
Lost musical comedy films